Saulius Širmelis (born 31 May 1956) is a Lithuanian football coach.

Career
On 2 June 2017, Širmelis was appointed as the new manager of Shakhter Karagandy.

Širmelis was appointed manager of Swedish club AFC Eskilstuna on 5 September 2019. On 4 November 2019, he left the club again.

On 23 May 2020, Širmelis was appointed as the head coach of the Lithuanian defending champions FK Sūduva.

References

External links

1956 births
Living people
Lithuanian football managers
FK Panerys Vilnius managers
FBK Kaunas managers
FK Ventspils managers
FK Žalgiris managers
1. FC Tatran Prešov managers
FK Ekranas managers
Atlantis FC managers
FK Atlantas managers
FC Akzhayik managers
FC Ordabasy managers
FC Shakhter Karagandy managers
AFC Eskilstuna managers
FK Jelgava managers
Lithuanian expatriate football managers
Lithuanian expatriate sportspeople in Slovakia
Expatriate football managers in Slovakia
Lithuanian expatriate sportspeople in Finland
Expatriate football managers in Finland
Lithuanian expatriate sportspeople in Kazakhstan
Expatriate football managers in Kazakhstan
Lithuanian expatriate sportspeople in Latvia
Expatriate football managers in Latvia
People from Biržai